Jack Duane Ellena (October 27, 1931 – March 23, 2012) was an American football player.

Ellena played offensive tackle for coach Red Sanders at UCLA from 1952 to 1954. He was a member of the Bruins team that lost the 1954 Rose Bowl and was named that year's FWAA & UPI national champions. That same year, Ellena was named to the College Football All-America Team and won the UPI Lineman of the Year.

In addition to playing football for the Bruins, Ellena wrestled heavyweight at UCLA. He was a two-time Pacific Coast Intercollegiate heavyweight champ (1953, 1954), and placed fourth at the 1953 NCAA wrestling championships at Penn State, earning All-American honors.

Ellena was selected in the 19th round (228th overall) of the 1953 NFL Draft by the Los Angeles Rams. He played guard and nose guard for the Rams from 1955 to 1956. He was cut by the Rams in 1957 and was unable sign with any teams in the National Football League or Canadian Football League.

After his football career, Ellena ran Mountain Meadow Ranch, a summer camp located near his home town of Susanville, California. In 1987, he was inducted into the UCLA Athletic Hall of Fame.

References

1931 births
2012 deaths
All-American college football players
American football offensive linemen
American football linebackers
Los Angeles Rams players
UCLA Bruins football players
People from Susanville, California
Players of American football from California